Egypt competed in the 2008 Summer Olympics  held in Beijing, People's Republic of China, from 8 to 24 August 2008.

Medalists

Archery

Egypt sent archers to the Olympics for the third time, seeking the nation's first Olympic medal in the sport. Amr Ghanem earned the country a qualifying spot in the men's competition by placing second in the 2008 African championship. Amira Mansour did the same in the women's competition.

Athletics

Men
Track & road events

Field events

Badminton

Boxing

Egypt qualified three boxers for the Olympic boxing tournament. Yasser was the first to qualify, at the World Championships. The other two Egyptian boxers qualified at the first African qualifying tournament.

Equestrian

Show jumping

Fencing 

Men

Women

Gymnastics

Artistic
Men

Women

Handball

Men's tournament

Egypt had qualified for the men's team event by winning the 2008 Africa Nations' Handball Cup in Luanda, Angola.
 Men's team event – 1 team of 14 players

Roster

Group play

Judo

Men

Women

Modern pentathlon

Rowing 

Men

Women

Shooting

Men

Women

Swimming

Men

Synchronized swimming

Table tennis

Taekwondo

Volleyball

Indoor
Egypt entered a team in the men's tournament. The team lost all five matches in the group play, and did not advance, finishing tied for 11th place.

Men's tournament

Roster

Group play

Weightlifting

Wrestling 

Men's freestyle

Men's Greco-Roman

Women's freestyle

See also
 Egypt at the 2008 Summer Paralympics

References
General

Specific

External links 
 Egyptian NOC page on official 2008 Summer Olympics Website

Nations at the 2008 Summer Olympics
2008
Summer Olympics